Jared Leonardo Ulloa Bazán (born 8 June 2002) is a Peruvian professional footballer who plays as a winger for Canadian club Valour FC.

Early life
Ulloa began playing with the Academia César Antonio UCV at age 13 and then joined the Academia San Antonio de Piura in 2015. In 2017, he joined the youth system of Sporting Cristal, where he won two reserve league titles and the Torneo Centenario.

Club career
In 2021, he signed a professional contract with Sporting Cristal. Shortly thereafter, he went on loan to Valour FC of the Canadian Premier League. He made his professional debut for Valour on June 27, 2021 against Forge FC.

In January 2022, he was sent on loan to Cusco FC of the Peruvian Segunda División. However, in March 2022, he terminated his contract with Sporting Cristal by mutual consent, and joined Cusco permanently. With Cusco, he won the second division title in 2022.

In February 2023, he returned to Valour FC on a permanent contract. Valour had been interested in bringing him back the year prior for the 2022 season, however, he was deemed to be unavailable.

International career
Ulloa was born in Peru to a Canadian father, and is eligible for both national teams.

In 2017, he played for the Peru U15 national team.

References

External links

2002 births
Living people
Association football forwards
Peruvian footballers
Canadian soccer players
People from Piura
Peruvian people of Canadian descent
Sporting Cristal footballers
Valour FC players
Canadian Premier League players
Cusco FC footballers
Peruvian Segunda División players